is a Japanese boxer. He competed in the men's lightweight event at the 1960 Summer Olympics. At the 1960 Summer Olympics, he defeated Abdel Kader Gangani of Morocco, before losing to Ferenc Kellner of Hungary.

References

1938 births
Living people
Japanese male boxers
Olympic boxers of Japan
Boxers at the 1960 Summer Olympics
Sportspeople from Tokyo
Lightweight boxers